Madhunandan is an Indian actor who appears in Telugu films. He began his film career with the 2001 Telugu film, Nuvvu Nenu. He has been in the film industry since he was 19 years old. He did a Masters in Business Administration from Osmania University, and later relocated to the United States. Nitin confirmed his role in Gunde Jaari Gallanthayyinde, which was his first successful film.

Partial filmography

References

External links
 

Telugu comedians
Indian male comedians
Telugu male actors
Living people
1982 births
Indian male film actors
21st-century Indian actors
Male actors from Andhra Pradesh
Male actors in Telugu cinema